Guilt is a moral emotion that occurs when a person believes or realizes—accurately or not—that they have compromised their own standards of conduct or have violated universal moral standards and bear significant responsibility for that violation.
Guilt is closely related to the concept of remorse, regret, as well as shame.

Guilt is an important factor in perpetuating obsessive–compulsive disorder symptoms.

Etymology 
The etymology of the word is obscure, and developed its modern spelling from the O.E. form gylt "crime, sin, fault, fine, debt", which is possibly derived from O.E. gieldan "to pay for, debt". Because it was used in the Lord's Prayer as the translation for the Latin debitum and also in Matthew xviii. 27, and gyltiȝ is used to render debet in Matthew xxiii. 18, it has been inferred to have had the primary sense of ‘debt’, though there is no real evidence for this.

Its development into a "sense of guilt" is first recorded in 1690 as a misuse of its original meaning. "Guilt by association" is first recorded in 1941. 

"Guilty" is similarly from O.E. gyltig, itself from gylt.

Psychology 
Guilt and its associated causes, advantages, and disadvantages are common themes in psychology and psychiatry. Both in specialized and in ordinary language, guilt is an affective state in which one experiences conflict at having done something that one believes one should not have done (or conversely, having not done something one believes one should have done). It gives rise to a feeling which does not go away easily, driven by 'conscience'. Sigmund Freud described this as the result of a struggle between the ego and the superego – parental imprinting. Freud rejected the role of God as punisher in times of illness or rewarder in time of wellness. While removing one source of guilt from patients, he described another. This was the unconscious force within the individual that contributed to illness, Freud in fact coming to consider "the obstacle of an unconscious sense of guilt...as the most powerful of all obstacles to recovery." For his later explicator, Lacan, guilt was the inevitable companion of the signifying subject who acknowledged normality in the form of the Symbolic order.

Alice Miller claims that "many people suffer all their lives from this oppressive feeling of guilt, the sense of not having lived up to their parents' expectations....no argument can overcome these guilt feelings, for they have their beginnings in life's earliest period, and from that they derive their intensity." This may be linked to what Les Parrott has called "the disease of false guilt....At the root of false guilt is the idea that what you feel must be true." If you feel guilty, you must be guilty!

The philosopher Martin Buber underlined the difference between the Freudian notion of guilt, based on internal conflicts, and existential guilt, based on actual harm done to others.

Guilt is often associated with anxiety. In mania, according to Otto Fenichel, the patient succeeds in applying to guilt "the defense mechanism of denial by overcompensation...re-enacts being a person without guilt feelings."

In psychological research, guilt can be measured by using questionnaires, such as the Differential Emotions Scale (Izard's DES), or the Dutch Guilt Measurement Instrument.

Defenses 
According to psychoanalytic theory, defenses against feeling guilt can become an overriding aspect of one's personality. The methods that can be used to avoid guilt are multiple.  They include:
Repression, usually used by the superego and ego against instinctive impulses, but on occasion employed against the superego/conscience itself. If the defence fails, then (in a return of the repressed) one may begin to feel guilty years later for actions lightly committed at the time.
Projection is another defensive tool with wide applications. It may take the form of blaming the victim: The victim of someone else's accident or bad luck may be offered criticism, the theory being that the victim may be at fault for having attracted the other person's hostility. Alternatively, not the guilt, but the condemning agency itself, may be projected onto other people, in the hope that they will look upon one's deeds more favorably than one's own conscience (a process that verges on ideas of reference).
Sharing a feeling of guilt, and thereby being less alone with it, is a motive force in both art and joke-telling; while it is also possible to "borrow" a sense of guilt from someone who is seen as in the wrong, and thereby assuage one's own.
Self-harm may be used as an alternative to compensating the object of one's transgression – perhaps in the form of not allowing oneself to enjoy opportunities open to one, or benefits due, as a result of uncompensated guilt feelings.

Behavioral responses 
Guilt proneness is reliably associated with moral character. Similarly, feelings of guilt can prompt subsequent virtuous behavior. People who feel guilty may be more likely to exercise restraint, avoid self-indulgence, and exhibit less prejudice. Guilt appears to prompt reparatory behaviors to alleviate the negative emotions that it engenders. People appear to engage in targeted and specific reparatory behaviors toward the persons they wronged or offended.

Lack of guilt in psychopaths 
Individuals high in psychopathy lack any true sense of guilt or remorse for harm they may have caused others. Instead, they rationalize their behavior, blame someone else, or deny it outright. People with psychopathy have a tendency to be harmful to themselves and to others. They have little ability to plan ahead for the future. An individual with psychopathy will never find themselves at fault because they will do whatever it takes to benefit themselves without reservation. A person that does not feel guilt or remorse would have no reason to find themselves at fault for something that they did with the intention of hurting another person. To a person high in psychopathy, their actions can always be rationalized to be the fault of another person. This is seen by psychologists as part of a lack of moral reasoning (in comparison with the majority of humans), an inability to evaluate situations in a moral framework, and an inability to develop emotional bonds with other people due to a lack of empathy.

Causes

Evolutionary theories 
Some evolutionary psychologists theorize that guilt and shame helped maintain beneficial relationships, such as reciprocal altruism. If a person feels guilty when he harms another or fails to reciprocate kindness, he is more likely not to harm others or become too selfish. In this way, he reduces the chances of retaliation by members of his tribe, and thereby increases his survival prospects, and those of the tribe or group. As with any other emotion, guilt can be manipulated to control or influence others. As highly social animals living in large, relatively stable groups, humans need ways to deal with conflicts and events in which they inadvertently or purposefully harm others. If someone causes harm to another, and then feels guilt and demonstrates regret and sorrow, the person harmed is likely to forgive. Thus, guilt makes it possible to forgive, and helps hold the social group together.

Collective guilt 

Collective guilt (or group guilt) is the unpleasant and often emotional reaction that results among a group of individuals when it is perceived that the group illegitimately harmed members of another group. It is often the result of "sharing a social identity with others whose actions represent a threat to the positivity of that identity". For an individual to experience collective guilt, he must identify himself as a part of the in-group. "This produces a perceptual shift from thinking of oneself in terms of 'I' and 'me' to 'us' or 'we'.”

Comparison with shame 
Guilt and shame are two closely related concepts, but they have key differences that should not be overlooked. Cultural Anthropologist Ruth Benedict describes shame as the result of a violation of cultural or social values, while guilt is conjured up internally when one's personal morals are violated. To put it more simply, the primary difference between shame and guilt is the source that creates the emotion. Shame arises from a real or imagined negative perception coming from others and guilt arises from a negative perception of one's own thoughts or actions.

Psychoanalyst Helen Block Lewis stated that, "The experience of shame is directly about the self, which is the focus of evaluation. In guilt, the self is not the central object of negative evaluation, but rather the thing done is the focus." An individual can still possess a positive perception of themselves while also feeling guilt for certain actions or thoughts they took part in. Contrary to guilt, Shame has a more inclusive focus on the individual as a whole. Fossum and Mason's ideas clearly outline this idea in their book Facing Shame. They state that "While guilt is a painful feeling of regret and responsibility for one's actions, shame is a painful feeling about oneself as a person".

Shame can almost be described as looking at yourself unfavorably through the eyes of others. Psychiatrist Judith Lewis Herman portrays this idea by stating that "Shame is an acutely self-conscious state in which the self is 'split,' imagining the self in the eyes of the other; by contrast, in guilt the self is unified". Both shame and guilt are directly related to self-perception, only shame causes the individual to account for the cultural and social beliefs of others. 

Paul Gilbert talks about the powerful hold that shame can take over someone in his article Evolution, Social Roles, and the Differences in Shame and Guilt. He says that "The fear of shame and ridicule can be so strong that people will risk serious physical injury or even death to avoid it. One of the reasons for this is because shame can indicate serious damage to social acceptance and a breakdown in a variety of social relationships. The evolutionary root of shame is in a self-focused, social threat system related to competitive behavior and the need to prove oneself acceptable/desirable to others" Guilt on the other hand evolved from a place of Care-Giving and avoidance of any act that harms others.

Cultural views 

Traditional Japanese society, Korean society and Chinese culture are sometimes said to be "shame-based" rather than "guilt-based", in that the social consequences of "getting caught" are seen as more important than the individual feelings or experiences of the agent (see the work of Ruth Benedict). The same has been said of Ancient Greek society, a culture where, in Bruno Snell's words, if "honour is destroyed the moral existence of the loser collapses."

This may lead to more of a focus on etiquette than on ethics as understood in Western civilization, leading some in Western civilizations to question why the word ethos was adapted from Ancient Greek with such vast differences in cultural norms. Christianity and Islam inherit most notions of guilt from Judaism, Persian, and Roman ideas, mostly as interpreted through Augustine, who adapted Plato's ideas to Christianity. The Latin word for guilt is culpa, a word sometimes seen in law literature, for instance in mea culpa meaning "my fault (guilt)".

In literature 
Guilt is a main theme in John Steinbeck's East of Eden, Fyodor Dostoyevsky's Crime and Punishment, Tennessee Williams' A Streetcar Named Desire, William Shakespeare's play Macbeth, Edgar Allan Poe's "The Tell-Tale Heart" and "The Black Cat", and many other works of literature. In Sartre's The Flies, the Furies (in the form of flies) represent the morbid, strangling forces of neurotic guilt which bind us to authoritarian and totalitarian power.

Guilt is a major theme in many works by Nathaniel Hawthorne, and is an almost universal concern of novelists who explore inner life and secrets.

In Epicurean Philosophy 
In his Kyriai Doxai (Principal Doctrines) 17 and 35, Epicurus teaches that we may identify and diagnose guilt by its signs and perturbations. Within his ethical system based on pleasure and pain, guilt manifests as constant fear of detection that emerges from "secretly doing something contrary to an agreement to not harm one another or be harmed".

Since Epicurus rejects supernatural claims, the easiest way to avoid this perturbation is to avoid the antisocial behavior in order to continue enjoying ataraxia (the state of no-perturbation). However, once guilt is unavoidable, Epicurean Guides recommended confession of one's offenses as a practice that helps to purge the character from its evil tendencies and reform the character. According to Norman DeWitt, author of "St Paul and Epicurus", confession was one of the Epicurean practices that was later appropriated by the early Christian communities.

In the Christian Bible 
Guilt in the Christian Bible is not merely an emotional state but is a legal state of deserving punishment. The Hebrew Bible does not have a unique word for guilt, but uses a single word to signify: "sin, the guilt of it, the punishment due unto it, and a sacrifice for it." The Greek New Testament uses a word for guilt that means "standing exposed to judgment for sin" (e. g., Romans 3:19). In what Christians call the "Old Testament", Christians believe the Bible teaches that, through sacrifice, one's sins can be forgiven (Judaism categorically rejects this idea, holding that forgiveness of sin is exclusively through repentance, and the role of sacrifices was for atonement of sins committed by accident or ignorance ). The New Testament says that this forgiveness is given as written in 1 Corinthians 15:3–4: "3 For what I received I passed on to you as of first importance: that Christ died for our sins according to the Scriptures, for that he was buried, that he was raised on the third day according to the Scriptures." Some believe that the Old and New Testaments have differing opinions on the expiation of guilt because the Old Testaments were subject to the Age of Law and the New Testaments replace the Age of Law with the now current Age of Grace. However, both in the Old Testament and the New Testament salvation was granted based on God's grace and forgiveness (Gen 6:8; 19:19; Exo 33:12–17; 34:6–7). Animal sacrifices were only a symbol of the future sacrifice of Jesus Christ (Heb 10:1–4; 9–12). The whole world is guilty before God for abandoning him and his ways (Rom 3:19). In Jesus Christ, God took upon himself the sins of the world and died on the cross to pay our debt (Rom 6:23). Those who repent and accept the sacrifice of Jesus Christ for their sins, will be redeemed by God and thus not guilty before him. They will be granted eternal life which will take effect when Jesus comes the second time (1 Thess 4:13–18). In contrast to surrounding nations which addressed their guilt with human sacrifice, the Israeli authors of the Bible called that an abomination (1 Kings 11:7, Jer 32:35). The Bible agrees with pagan cultures that guilt creates a cost that someone must pay (Heb 9:22). (This assumption was expressed in the previous section, "Defences": "Guilty people punish themselves if they have no opportunity to compensate the transgression that caused them to feel guilty. It was found that self-punishment did not occur if people had an opportunity to compensate the victim of their transgression.") But unlike pagan deities who demanded it be paid by humans, God, according to the Bible, loved us enough to pay it Himself, as a good father would, while calling us His "children" and calling Himself our "father" (Mat 5:45).

See also

Further reading 
 Adam Phillips, 'Guilt', in On Flirtation (1994) pp. 138–147
 Nina Coltart, 'Sin and the Super-ego', in Slouching Towards Bethlehem (1992)

References

External links 

Guilt, unconscious sense of
Michael Eigen, 'Guilt in an Age of Psychopathy'
Guilt, BBC Radio 4 discussion with Stephen Mulhall, Miranda Fricker & Oliver Davies (In Our Time, 1 Nov. 2007)

Emotions
 
Morality
Moral psychology
Philosophy of life